Charles Juliet (born 30 September 1934) in Jujurieux in Ain, is a French poet, playwright and novelist. He won the 2013  Prix Goncourt de la Poésie.

His works have been translated into German, Spanish, Italian, English, Polish, Japanese, Vietnamese, Turkish, Korean, Chinese, etc...

Biography
After his mother was sent to a psychiatry ward due to suicidal attempts, Charles Juliet was brought up by a family of Swiss peasants. At age 12, he went to school in Aix-en-Provence and at 20 he went on to study in Lyon. Three years later he dropped out and took to writing.

Fifteen years later he published his first book, Fragments, with a preface by Georges Haldas. During that time he also met with other artists, namely Michel Leiris, Raoul Ubac, Bram van Velde, Pierre Soulages and Samuel Beckett.

He lives in Lyon.

"Lambeaux" is currently on the syllabus for the French Baccalaureate.

Bibliography 

Au long de la spirale, (1975) 
Pages de pierre, (1977) 
La Plus Fragile, (1977)
Croissances,  (1978) 
Pages de journal, (1978) 
Vers la rencontre, (1980) 
Reviens à ta solitude,  (1983) 
Convergences,  (1984) 
 La lente montée (1984) 
Lettre suit,  (1985)
La Soif, (1987)
Tes yeux blessés, (1987)
Entretien avec Pierre Soulages, (1987)
Accords, (1987)
La vie affleure, (1989)
Tant de chemins, (1989)
L'Année de l'éveil, (1989), Grand prix des lectrices de Elle
Affûts, (1990)
Dans la lumière des saisons, (1991)
Le Don de présence, (1992)
Bribes pour un double, (1992)
Ce pays du silence, (1992)
Jean Reverzy, (1992)
L'Inattendu, (1992)
Tu avives, (1993)
Telluriennes, (1993)
Cette flamme claire,(1994)
Ce chemin,  (1994) 
 Carnets de Saorge, (1994)
 Entretien avec Raoul Ubac, (1994)
 Accueils - Journal 4 (1982-1988),  (1994)
Ce foyer secret, (1995)
Césire, n°4, (1995)
En amont, (1995)
Giacometti, (1995)
Failles, (1995)
Lambeaux,  (1995) 
A voix basse, (1997)
Lueur après labour - Journal 3 (1968-1981),  (1997)
Traversée de nuit - Journal 2 (1965-1968),  (1997)
Creuser, (1998)
La Mue,  (1998)
Ferveur, (1998)
Fouilles, (1998)
L'Autre Chemin, (1998)
Rencontres avec Bram van Velde, (1998)
La Traversée,  (1999)
Ecarte la nuit, (1999)
Rencontres avec Samuel Beckett,  (1999)
Chez François Dilasser, (1999)
Attente en automne, (1999)
Galet,  (2000)
Un lourd destin, (2000)
Ténèbres en terre froide - Journal 1 (1957-1964), (2000)
La Vague, (2001)
Invite le vent,  (2002)
Une joie secrète, (2002)
Eclats (2002)
Te rejoindre, (2002)
L'Incessant, (2002)
L'Autre Faim, (2003)
Notules,  (2005)
Ces bruits du monde extérieur, (2005)
Les Autoportraits de Jean-Michel Marchetti, (2005)
Au pays du long nuage blanc, (2005)
T.R.U.P.H.E.M.U.S, (2006)
L'opulence de la nuit, (2006)
D'une rive à l'autre, (2006)
Un jour, (2006)
L'absente, (2007)
Etty Hillesum, la fille qui ne savait pas prier, (2007)
Moisson, Choix de poèmes, (2012)
Gratitude, Journal IX 2004-2008, (2017)
Rencontres avec Bram Van Velde, Nouvelle Édition Augmentée, (2020)

References

1934 births
Living people
People from Ain
20th-century French novelists
21st-century French novelists
20th-century French poets
20th-century French dramatists and playwrights
French male poets
French male novelists
21st-century French dramatists and playwrights
20th-century French male writers
21st-century French male writers